Inside Recordings is a Los Angeles, California based independent record label founded by singer-songwriter Jackson Browne in 1999.  Browne has stated that the mission of the label is to "create a haven for music that might not find a home in the mainstream."  In 2005, Inside Recordings signed a nationwide direct distribution deal with independent music distributor Alternative Distribution Alliance. The label's inaugural release under the agreement was Browne's own Solo Acoustic, Vol. 1, which was released in the U.S. on October 11, 2005. It was nominated for a Grammy Award soon afterward, just as Solo Acoustic, Vol. 2 was released. Artists with works previously released on the label include the Joel Rafael Band and Native American activist and spoken word artist John Trudell.

In 2008, Browne released his first studio recording in five years; Time the Conqueror on Inside Recordings.

See also 
 List of record labels

External links
 Official site

American independent record labels
Record labels established in 1999
1999 establishments in California
Companies based in Los Angeles